This list of law enforcement awards and honors is an index to articles that describe notable awards related to law enforcement. The list is organized by region and country. Most of the awards are to law enforcement officers in the country granting the award.

International

Africa

Americas

Asia

Europe

Oceania

See also

 Lists of awards
 List of awards for contributions to society

References

 
Law enforcement